Norhizam bin Hassan Baktee is a Malaysian politician who served as Member of the Malacca State Executive Council (EXCO) in the Barisan Nasional (BN) state administration under Chief Minister Sulaiman Md Ali from March 2020 to his resignation in October 2021 and in the Pakatan Harapan (PH) state administration under former Chief Minister Adly Zahari from May 2018 to the collapse of the PH state administration in March 2020. He also served as Member of the Malacca State Legislative Assembly (MLA) for Pengkalan Batu from May 2018 to November 2021. He is now an independent aligned with the ruling BN coalition. He was previously a member of the Democratic Action Party (DAP), a component party of the Pakatan Harapan (PH) opposition coalition. He is also informally known by his nicknames such as  Hulk  or  Gangster , for his temperamental mood and fondness of wearing body-fit shirts.

Political career
Norhizam an ex-lorry driver, was a United Malays National Organisation (UMNO) of Pantai Peringgit branch before he quit in 2006 to join DAP as he felt that the UMNO is not a trustworthy and transparent party anymore and in following the footstep of his father; who contested twice in the 1980s elections as DAP candidate but had failed to win the seat known as Peringgit then which Norhizam himself redeemed and represented later after he was elected to Malacca State Legislative Assembly as a MLA for Pengkalan Batu constituency picked by DAP to contest in the 2018 Malacca state election and appointed as EXCO member after PH came into power as administration under Melaka PH Chairman Adly Zahari as Chief Minister in May 2018. He also been conferred the Malacca state "Datukship" title and award in 2019.

After the collapsed of PH state government following the so-called 'Sheraton Move' in 2020 Malaysian political crisis, Norhizam somehow withdrew support for PH and left DAP to be independent and defected to support BN-PN to form a new state government instead, allowing BN came into power again under Chief Minister Sulaiman Md Ali and he was reappointed EXCO member.

In October 2021, he and three other MLAs withdrew support for the BN government and it has again collapsed, triggering the snap 2021 Malacca state election. Norhizam after being rejected by PH to contest under its banner, decided to defend the seat as an independent candidate in the November state election. Failing to keep his seat, he only managed to garner 1,218 votes in the five-cornered fight won by BN's Kalsom Nordin.

Controversies 
In October 2018, Norhizam's rude manner and heated shouting argument including his arrogant outburst, "Siapa YB? Awak YB kah saya YB?" (Who's the assemblyman? You or me?) when he was engaging his constituents and villagers of Kampung Pulai Nibong who had brought up the issue about a road being closed was widely circulated online and caught social media attention. His remarks had caused netizens to criticise Norhizam as an unfit lawmaker and should be sacked.

Norhizam as the Agriculture, Agro-Based, Entrepreneur Development and Cooperative Committee EXCO had in September 2019 made an unproven assumption that the state was being invaded with Indonesian wild boars swam across the narrow Strait of Malacca from Sumatera which was refuted by Malaysian Nature Society (MNS). His in-doubt claims had caused infuriation from the neighbouring country and his obsession with the endangered animal even led him to set-up a task force to eradicate them which had earned him the  'Pig Shooting Champ'  title in jest.

He called Low Chee Leong, MLA for Kota Laksamana "babi" (pig), "bodoh" (stupid) and "banggang" (idiot) in the state assembly sitting in May 2020. Both of them were formerly MLAs from DAP before Norhizam turn independent supporting the opposing political coalition.

On 13 October 2021, Malacca police seized his official car after his refusal to return it following his termination as EXCO member due to the dissolution of the state assembly on 4 October 2021.

Personal life
He has been married with Norlishah Ibrahim and has two children.

Election results

Honours

Honours of Malaysia
  :
  Companion Class I of the Order of Malacca (DMSM) – Datuk (2019)

References

External links
 

1966 births
Living people
Malaysian people of Malay descent
Malaysian Muslims
Independent politicians in Malaysia
Former United Malays National Organisation politicians
Former Democratic Action Party (Malaysia) politicians
Members of the Malacca State Legislative Assembly
Malacca state executive councillors
21st-century Malaysian politicians